The Flag Protection Act of 2005 was a proposed United States federal law introduced in the United States Senate at the 109th United States Congress on October 24, 2005, by Senator Bob Bennett (R-Utah) and co-sponsored by Senator Hillary Clinton (D-N.Y.).  Later co-sponsors included Barbara Boxer (D-Calif.), Mark Pryor (D-Ark.) and Thomas Carper (D-Del.).

The law would have prohibited burning or otherwise destroying and damaging the US flag with the primary purpose of intimidation or inciting immediate violence or for the act of terrorism. It called for a punishment of no more than one year in prison and a fine of no more than $100,000; unless that flag was property of the United States Government, in which case the penalty would be a fine of not more than $250,000, not more than two years in prison, or both.

The nonpartisan Congressional Research Service summarized the act as follows:

Although the Supreme Court ruled in Texas v. Johnson (1989) that flag-burning was protected by the First Amendment, the bill was intended, according to The New York Times, to take the issue back to the Supreme Court, which was more conservative in 2005 than it was in 1989, in order to overturn that earlier decision. Since the law was not passed or even considered by the United States Congress, its constitutionality was never challenged in the Supreme Court.

References

External links
 S.1911 - Flag Protection Act of 2005 on Congress.gov

Flag controversies in the United States
Proposed legislation of the 109th United States Congress
Hillary Clinton